The following is a list of bacon dishes. The word bacon is derived from the Old French word bacon, and cognate with the Old High German bacho, meaning "buttock", "ham", or "side of bacon". Bacon is made from the sides, belly, or back of the pig and contains varying amounts of fat depending on the cut. It is cured and smoked over wood cut from apple trees, mesquite trees, or hickory trees. Bacon is used as an ingredient or condiment in a number of dishes.

Bacon dishes

See also

 Bacon mania
 List of bacon substitutes
 List of ham dishes
 List of pork dishes
 List of sausage dishes
 List of smoked foods

References

Bacon